Luma is a genus of moths of the family Crambidae. The genus was erected by Francis Walker in 1863.

Species
Luma albifascialis Hampson, 1897
Luma anticalis Walker, 1863
Luma flavalis Hampson, 1893
Luma flavimarginalis Hampson, 1907
Luma holoxantha Hampson, 1907
Luma longidentalis Hampson, 1903
Luma macropsalis Hampson, 1897
Luma obscuralis (Swinhoe, 1895)
Luma trimaculata Hampson, 1897
Luma unicolor (Moore, 1886)

Former species
Loxocorys sericea (Butler, 1879)

References

External links
 
 

Spilomelinae
Crambidae genera
Taxa named by Francis Walker (entomologist)